This is a listing of all light novels in the Vampire Hunter D series, written by Hideyuki Kikuchi, illustrated by Yoshitaka Amano, Ayami Kojima and Vincent Chong, and translated by Kevin Leahy and Takami Nieda.

Publication history

Japanese editions
Known simply as the  series in Japan, the first novel, Vampire Hunter "D", was written by Hideyuki Kikuchi and published in 1983. To date, over 35 novels have been published in the main series, with some novels comprising as many as four volumes; including the supplemental volume, Dark Nocturne, over 50 individual volumes have been published. The series has also spawned anime, audio drama, and manga adaptations, art books, and a supplemental guide book.

All of the official publications in the series were originally published by Asahi Sonorama under the Sonorama Bunko label.

Following the closing of the Sonorama branch in September 2007, the release of D - Throng of Heretics in October 2007 under the Asahi Bunko - Sonorama Selection label marked the transition to the new publisher, Asahi Shimbun Publishing, a division of Asahi Sonorama's parent company. From December 2007 through January 2008, Asahi Shimbun Publishing reprinted the complete Vampire Hunter catalogue under the Sonorama Selection label, including e-book releases on the Kindle platform.

In January 2011, Asahi Sonorama published the first spinoff light novel series set in the Vampire Hunter universe, a prequel series written by Kikuchi titled , illustrated by Ayami Kojima, artist and character designer for the Castlevania series of video games. Only two volumes were published, both in hardcover, with a planned third volume on hold since 2013. In May and June 2021 Asahi Shimbun published new paperback and Kindle editions of the two volumes, featuring new cover illustrations by Yoshitaka Amano.

In November 2017, Kikuchi began to serialize new Vampire Hunter stories in Asahi Shimbun's monthly magazine  with the story Vampire Hunter: D — Deadened City. These stories are later collected and printed as full entries in the main series, sometimes under new titles. The current ongoing story, began serialization in February 2022.

English editions
On May 11, 2005, the first official English translation was released by DH Press and Digital Manga Publishing, translated by Kevin Leahy. Translations of subsequent volumes have released at a relatively consistent annual or biannual pace, and supplementary material including a guidebook and two artbooks have also been published.

The numbering scheme for the official English releases are inconsistent with the original Japanese, as each book is individually numbered regardless of whether multi-part stories are divided between multiple volumes or compiled into a single volume, and because the supplementary short story anthology Dark Nocturne is included. In cases where multi-part stories are compiled in a single volume, the second volume's cover is presented as a color frontispiece.

In 2012 Dark Horse Books began to publish e-book editions of the series on the Kindle platform, and after 2014 Dark Horse Books took over as the publishing imprint for future print editions.

In 2013 Viz Media's Haikasoru imprint released an official English translation of the first book in the prequel series, retitled Noble V: Greylancer, translated by Takami Nieda with newly commissioned cover artwork by Vincent Chong.

In 2021 Dark Horse Books began to publish omnibus editions with Vampire Hunter D Omnibus: Book One collecting the first three novels in the series. In late 2021 they also began to publish official dramatized audiobook adaptations of the novels produced by GraphicAudio, featuring a full voice cast, music, and sound effects.

Vampire Hunter series

Vampire Hunter D

Doris Lang, orphaned daughter of a Werewolf Hunter, hires the dhampir Vampire Hunter D to take care of Count Magnus Lee. But the vampiric ruler of that Frontier sector is only one of her problems.

The Count's daughter Larmica and the werewolf retainer Garou are determined to see Doris dead before she can be drawn into their "family." Greco Rohman, son of the chief of Ransylva village, has his lecherous eye on Doris. And dashing, deadly Rei-Ginsei and his Fiend Corps are also closing in.

This book was adapted into the first Vampire Hunter D animated movie, Vampire Hunter D. Collected in Vampire Hunter D Omnibus: Book One.

Raiser of Gales

A long, hard winter, due perhaps to problems with the weather controllers, has isolated the village of Tepes. Near the village stands a strange hill, a one-time stronghold of the Nobility which still contains beautiful paintings and experimental equipment. Ten years earlier, four children disappeared while playing, only to reappear a month later.

Now in 12090 A.D., a new terror grips the village as the victims of vampires moving in daylight begin to appear. The village turns of course to D, who finds that all suspicion has already fallen on those missing children, three of whom have now grown into excellent adults. The girl Lina in particular is fascinated by vampire art, even though it may cost her a scholarship to the Capital—her only chance of leaving the hick village.

Collected in Vampire Hunter D Omnibus: Book One.

Demon Deathchase

With his dying breath, an old man begs that his daughter and the Noble who made off with her be pursued and, if necessary, slain. Their destination is a spaceport in the Claybourne States and their ultimate goal—a world where their love might be safe. The vampire Mayerling is perhaps the only one humans ever spoke well of, and the girl, who remains strangely nameless throughout the book, goes with him of her own free will.

Still, the old man puts a hefty price on their heads, and that sort of blood in the water draws Hunters—the notorious Marcus clan and D. The four Marcus brothers Borgoff, Nolt, Groveck, and Kyle, along with their sister Leila, are as famous for their Vampire Hunting as they are for their predilection toward killing off the competition, and they hide a dark secret about their sister as well.

As if all this warfare was not lively enough, Mayerling pulls through the hamlet of Barbarois and enlists a trio of powerful bodyguards from the local population—all of which are human/monster half-breeds.

This novel was loosely adapted into the second VHD animated movie, Vampire Hunter D: Bloodlust. Collected in Vampire Hunter D Omnibus: Book One.

Tale of the Dead Town

Pausing long enough to rescue a young lady and make an apparent ally, D rendezvous with his next place of employment, a city of 500 which floats a meter above the ground and cruises at 20 km/h. "The Town," long thought safe from marauding monsters, has suffered a rash of vampire attacks. But the introduction of D, the young lady and former tenant of said city Lori Knight and the brash John M. Brasselli Pluto VIII does little to alleviate their woes.

The Stuff of Dreams

D goes to a thriving town where, in the past ages, mortals and the Nobility lived together peacefully. The 17-year-old beauty Sybille Schmitz has slept there for 30 years since being bitten, neither waking nor aging. It is dreams of her dancing in a ghostly chateau bathed in blue light that lure D there, where the entire village has already dreamt of the handsome dhampir.

There are a number of folks who feel that by awakening the sleeping woman, the Vampire Hunter will destroy their peaceful world, and they would gladly kill D to prevent that. After all, their village produces 20 times as much food as they need, and the exporting of that bounty has made them quite comfortable. And the murderous Bio Brothers, Harold and Duncan, are called in to see to the disposal of the cursed half-breed D.

Pilgrimage of the Sacred and the Profane

A supposedly impassable desert lies between the Inner and Outer Frontier. To cross it, the centenarian Granny Viper is looking for some powerful backup. Granny is a "people finder" and she must ferry her latest find, a young woman named Tae, across to the town of Barnabas in the next four days.

As an "abductee" who lived 8 years in the vampire castle of Gradinia, Tae is the object of suspicion. Her only hope for future happiness is pinned on arriving in Barnabas before the last of her blood relations move on. Hoping to play on the sympathies of frosty D and enlist his aid, Granny offends her other potential escorts—those renowned warriors of the Frontier, Bingo and Clay Bullow. The following arrangement is reached: D is traveling to Barnabas on business of his own, Granny and Tae are free to follow him, and the Bullow Brothers tag along as well to settle the score with D when the journey is over. But it will not be easy going, as the desert has a mind of its own.

Mysterious Journey to the North Sea

In D — Mysterious Journey to the North Sea (Part One), the 17-year-old Wu-Lin is traveling from the fishing village of Florence to Cronenberg to have a strange jewel appraised. No less than three people try to steal it from her: the young commoner Toto, an old artist named Professor Krolock, and the grotesque Gilligan, an obscenely overweight gangland boss in a custom exo-skeleton. He has Wu-Lin killed, but her dying request of D is that he bring the gem back to her older sister Su-In in their village on the north sea.

Gilligan is determined to have the gem. He dispatches five mysterious individuals with the promise that the one who brings it to him will get all he possesses. This group consists of such colorful characters as Shin the Puppetman, King Egbert, Undiscernible Twin, and Reminiscence Samon. Also tailing D from Cronenberg is handsome Glen, a warrior and "seeker of knowledge" who wants to kill the Vampire Hunter because he's the only thing he has ever feared.

The second part of the story, D — Mysterious Journey to the North Sea (Part Two), begins when everyone arrives in Florence just as its short, week-long summer is about to begin. Millennia ago, the area had been a resort for the Nobility until the day, about 1000 years ago, when a traveler in black arrived and punished the cruel vampire residents. Only Baron Meinster refused to leave, and the traveler threw him into the sea. Now, for the past few years, the village's summer has been marred by vampire attacks -- "Meinster's Revenge." Su-In hired D because something particularly distressing is going on here. Though the whole world knows that the Nobility have difficulty with rain or flowing water, the vampire in Florence seems to be coming from the sea.

The Rose Princess

In the village of Sacuri a young lady is brought by carriage to see a Noble woman, but before the princess can finish feeding on this offering, a young man shows up and attempts to slay the vampire. He fails, but with the aid of a glider-like backpack he manages to escape from her and her armored bodyguards. But back in the village, the entire populace is being held prisoner until he is captured. No one may leave or enter, under pain of death, and if the youth is not found in ten days, ten villagers will be impaled with five more villagers to be drawn and quartered for every day after that he remains missing.

D arrives just as two of the four knights who serve the princess are keeping several families from fleeing. Even after a third knight arrives on the scene, they do nothing to stop him from entering the village. Clearly the Blue Knight, Red Knight, and Black Knight have reservations about crossing blades with the dashing Hunter. Once in town, he pays a visit to an old witch named Mama Kipsch to give her a message from her grandson—the youth who attacked the princess in the first place. D informs her that the boy is dead now, but that he recruited the Vampire Hunter before he died.

The village of Sacri, it seems, has made a deal with the devil: The princess has seen to it that their lands remained fertile and her superhuman knights have protected them from both bandits and monsters, but in return, they have had to let the princess feed on them. Still, not everyone in town is happy with the status quo. A group of biker toughs led by Elena would be all too happy to see the Vampire Hunter dispose of the local Nobility.

Pale Fallen Angel

When you want the job done right, hire a professional, and that's what Baron Byron Balazs does. As one of the blood-drinking Nobility, the Baron is hardly the sort of employer you would expect for a Vampire Hunter, but D agrees to act as his bodyguard in exchange for an obscene amount of money and the Baron's word that he won't dine on any humans during the long trip to Krauhausen. Furthermore, on their arrival there the good Baron wants D to dispose of Lord Vlad Balazs—his own father. He is truly his father's son, for at the same time Lord Vlad is retaining the services of a half dozen Hunters with promises of a king's ransom to the individual or group who does away with the young Baron. Joining the pair in their travels are the haughty Miska, a snobbish Noblewoman saved from the stake who also happens to be bound for Krauhausen, the adolescent acrobat team of Hugh and May, raised by a circus after vampires killed their parents, and, finally, the lovely Taki, formerly the assistant to the cruel trail magician Johann and currently fleeing from the same.

Twin-Shadowed Knight

D — Twin-Shadowed Knight 1 begins with D slaying a vampire, who leaves the triumphant Hunter with the cryptic words, "Find Muma." Not sure exactly if "Muma" is a person, place, or thing, D travels to the village of Sedoc, where a huge misty crater is attracting the dead for hundreds of miles around. In the village he meets Mia, the lovely young daughter of a  fortune-teller, who promptly retains his services. It seems that her mother has foreseen something terrible happening there, and being on her own deathbed, sent her daughter in her stead to try and prevent that catastrophe. But when they go to the newly formed crater to see what could prompt thousands of corpses to rise from their graves and throw themselves into that hole, things get really weird. The D that emerges from the mist brutally dispatches a vigilante group formed by the young men of the village, and begins to act quite unlike himself.

This other D, or "the false D" as he is called, has set up shop in the base at the bottom of the crater. While he looks and dresses just like the Hunter we know and love, there are differences, too. He's much more garrulous, has an eye for the ladies, and is certainly more emotional. However, the only physical difference is that he lacks the mysterious symbiotic face in his left hand. And while he is very protective of the strange experimental station, eventually he joins forces with D and Mia.

In D — Twin-Shadowed Knight 2, the trio hits the road in search of "Muma," running across two technicians who had assisted the vampires' "Sacred Ancestor" in his experiments, and had their lives strangely prolonged in the process. The first is a man named Gii, who has created a ghastly Lovecraftian creature that he worships as a god. His sister Shusha is a ghost now, killed as a witch by villagers she wanted to help and unable to move on due to the artificial heart the Sacred Ancestor gave her. Still able to feel pain, she is tortured by a twisted monk who sends a band of mounted skeletons after D.

In their travels, D, "the false D," and Mia see a mountain range collapse to reveal a road long concealed—the road that they must travel. But they are not alone on that torturous track. There are hundreds of victims of the Sacred Ancestor out there looking for him, hovering in a strange state which is neither life nor death, longing for him to taste their blood again. The road, it seems, is a part of his experiments, an unearthly form of natural selection that becomes more difficult with each step, ensuring that only the strongest can continue on.

Dark Road

Running across an isolated community composed entirely of former vampire victims, D rescues a woman named Rosaria from a human death squad that has annihilated the other pariahs, and deals with the killers as mercilessly as they dispatched the villagers. But before he can escort the woman to safety she is abducted by General Gaskell—perhaps the fiercest vampire Noble ever, surpassed only by the Sacred Ancestor in popularity among human researchers. An uncompromising warrior, the General had one side of his immortal body permanently burned when he remained locked in combat with a foe despite the rising of the sun. Gaskell knew secrets no other vampire did, and he led rebel forces in an assault on "the Capital" for hundreds of years before he was finally destroyed. But now he has strangely reappeared, and he's not alone—he commands a number of the most infamous vampires in history, renowned even more for the murder of their own kind than for that of humanity.

Though he must rescue Rosaria from Gaskell's floating castle, D finds himself on foot out in the middle of nowhere after his cyborg horse is destroyed, until salvation arrives in the form of a wagon train carrying a transport squad from the Frontier Commerce Guild. The Commerce Guild uses these wagons to supply goods to the scattered villages of the Frontier, so it's rather surprising when these astute business men refuse to let D pay for a horse—but in the end the deal they strike is much better indeed. Gaskell's mobile castle has drifted into the area, making their normally dangerous job that much more perilous, so they hire D as their escort in exchange for the horse. Before accepting the assignment D manages to extricate Rosaria from the castle, but in the process he's blinded by Madame Laurencin, one of Gaskell's evil cohorts.

In addition to General Gaskell and Madame Laurencin, there are a number of notable adversaries waiting for their crack at D. First is Duke Shuma, a fop with a lethal walking stick who has responded to the General's call in the place of his father. Roland, Duke of Xenon, is a heavily armored vampire who can summon spears out of thin air. His daughter, Lady Ann, is an 800-year-old vampire trapped in a body that looks less than 10, but she states she and her basket loaded with deadly flowers have one more kill to their credit than her infamous father does. Major General Gillis comes from a clan of assassins, and he has the ability to move in the form of a shadow. He also has his heart set on Lady Ann. Grand Duke Mehmet controls a giant robotic combat suit from a safe distance. The suit not only mimics his movements, but it also shares the recuperative powers of its vampire master for so long as he lives. And Doctor Gretchen is the ruthless Noblewoman who conducted her poisoning experiments on tens of thousands of humans and vampires. While poison cannot kill vampires, it can leave them in torment until the end of time, and it is said that thousands of her undying victims are still suffering in hidden labs.

Despite the fact that D is blind, and that Lady Ann nearly destroys his left hand in a misguided attempt to free him from its malignant influence, he manages to keep the vampires at bay. As a last resort, Gaskell decides he must put another fearsome warrior named Lord Rocambole into the fray—but Rocambole requires several sacrificial victims from the ranks of the vampires and there is a dearth of volunteers. In fact, it's rather amusing to see how each tries to strike a deal with the General to kill the others in order that he or she might be spared. And as the body count rises, Gaskell and his minions are left wondering just who exactly the Sacred Ancestor was trying to kill.

Tyrant's Stars

The story begins shortly after D — Dark Road, with D squaring off against Count Braujou, a  vampiric Nobleman who has sat in the same spot for 5001 years. D has been hired to dispatch him because the Capital wants to claim his treasure, and the two are just about to do battle when something crashes back to earth, destroying half the northern Frontier in the process.

This is what Braujou has waited long millennia for—the return of the renegade vampire Lawrence Valcua from his exile to outer space. Valcua is also known as "the Ultimate Noble," and he wields a mystic sword named Glencaliber that can open or close the fabric of space with a single slash. But despite being the hero who led the Nobility's attack against the alien homeworld when the O.S.B (outer-space beings) tried to take Earth from the vampires, he eventually earned him the wrath of others of his kind, including the Sacred Ancestor. When he was exiled to outer space, Valcua took his entire kingdom with him, and swore that when the time was right they would be back to have their revenge.

But Braujou has been waiting for more than just a fight with a skilled opponent. There is a promise he must keep. Back in the days when the other Nobility were trying to overcome Valcua, they found him a very worthy foe, indeed. The warlord Gaskell, Count Braujou, and Duke Harness were traveling to their showdown with him when they found a human by the side of the road. A former prisoner who had been kept in the Ultimate Noble's castle for experimentation, something about him moved Braujou to give him some medicine, and the man swore he'd repay that kindness. The vampires laughed and told the human he should accompany them to the castle then, and gave him no more thought. But after Harness was slain, and both Braujou and Gaskell were ready to fall to Valcua, the man appeared and saved them by knocking the Ultimate Noble back with a cross he fashioned from two swords, which enabled an escape. The grateful vampires were prepared to grant him any request, but knowing that someday Valcua would return and have his revenge on all those responsible for his defeat, he only asked that his descendants be protected from the horrible wrath that would eventually come. That man's name was Winslow Dyalhis.

Now, years later, Adele Dyalhis lives in the village of Somui with her teenage children Matthew and Sue and her good-for-nothing drunkard husband. Braujou and Duchess Miranda; the widow of Harness, rush to protect the Dyalhis family from certain retribution. However; seven of Valcua's powerful henchmen have already been sent to settle the long overdue account. Amongst the superhuman fiends there is a female water sprite named Lucienne (who can appear wherever there's water), a web-spinning mutant from the lunar colonies by the name of Speeny, the mesmerizing traveling preacher Curio, the ax-wielding Jessup the Beheader, and a young giant named Seurat. D has agreed to postpone his business with Braujou until he's had a chance to honor his agreement. Additionally; Mrs. Dyalhis is able to enlist D's protection for her children.

Fortress of the Elder God

The story begins when a nun delivers a mysterious orphan named Toto to a futuristic airport, where we meet the rest of the passengers who will accompany him on the flight to the Capital. There's the old married couple of Mr. And Mrs. Stow who left the center of known civilization to travel around the Frontier visiting their fully grown children. In rather sharp contrast to these normal folks is Jan, a petty gangster with a crescent scar on his face and a machete he'll pull at the drop on a hat, and Maria, a blonde boozer. A pair of cops called Wiseman and Goseau will also be on board, along with the "suckling" they're escorting—a hooded prisoner who has felt the bite of the Nobility, and Bierce, an arrow-hurling warrior who is past his prime.

When the group's aircraft is ravaged by an unknown force and goes down in the middle of a deadly zone strangely nicknamed "the playground," the passengers know that nearly all hope is lost—no search party would ever venture into the area, they are hundreds of miles from anywhere, and strange beasts are beginning to close in on them. Luckily for them D happens to be riding by, and he agrees to be their guard at Toto's request—but only after he has taken care of business at a strange fortress in the area. Given the choice of waiting there alone or traveling along with the Hunter on his perilous errand, the party chooses the latter.

The fortress in question has a chilling history. Thousands of years earlier, the Sacred Ancestor's army laid siege to it, because the Nobles there had taken to worshipping a tentacled "god" named Kururu. Vampires, it seems, do not have much of a knack for taking their own lives, so they wanted this dark god to destroy the whole world, themselves included. Three hundred believers in the fortress were able to hold out against 30,000 attackers for thirteen months due to their great faith and the power their "god" gave them. That same number of troops was killed in a single day, with only Arch Duke Valcua surviving the incident. Finally, the Sacred Ancestor alone made it through the doors and came out a year later—apparently so exhausted that he slept for the next century. But no one has been inside in the last 5000 years.

Once D arrives, the fortress goes back into operation, and another of the Sacred Ancestor's armies—at least 30,000 troops who were tucked away in another dimension waiting for such an occurrence—shows up to lay siege again. The army is hell-bent on getting into the fortress and destroying everyone inside, which is bad news for D and the stranded travelers since they have taken shelter in it. But they have more than the enemy at the walls to worry about, as a voice speaks to many of them and promises tremendous power in exchange for following its secretive instructions.

Mercenary Road

The action begins on a lazy day in Bossage, one of the Frontier's more prosperous towns. A ruthless quartet robs the local bank, slaughtering everyone present—and the chilling account of their actions is given by the first guard slain! His spirit has been channeled to explain that one of the four bank robbers is possessed by something that the guard fears even beyond the grave. The mayor of Bosage is trying to hire a pair of skilled warriors—a flamboyantly dressed man named Strider and a woman in dragon-scale armor by the name of Stanza—to go down the "Florence Highway" after the bank robbers, as well as to rescue people from the surrounding area from another threat.

It seems that a mysterious army once covered the road to Grand Duke Dolreack's castle, so that the "Florence Highway" is also known as the "Highway of the Enchanted Troops." And now reports have filtered into town that the enchanted troops are back, threatening everyone in the area. The mayor needs someone to go to the now-abandoned castle and rescue any humans who might have taken shelter there, since the castle is a kind of holy ground for the troops and should keep them at bay. He's just about to pay Strider and Stanza twice as much as he originally bargained for when the Vampire Hunter D rides into town. With D around, the two warriors will be lucky if they can get in on the job now at half the going rate, but the mayor didn't make his town rich by being stupid. He wants the added insurance of having the warriors go with the Vampire Hunter, whether any of the three likes it or not.

When he's not being pestered by either of the warriors, D is visited by a rather rotund and hirsute man with the unlikely appellation of "Beatrice." A decade earlier, Beatrice was part of a group of Hunters who ventured into Dolreack's castle, and he barely made it out alive. Although he no longer remembers what happened inside, he does have a notebook full of things he wrote in his delirium shortly after escaping the former lair of the Nobility, and he thinks this may be of interest to D.

While D and his companions are out battling their way through the rapidly growing forces—soldiers dressed in ash-gray military apparel who are roughly human except for their glassy green eyes and lipless slash of a mouth—they rescue a girl named Elene Slocum, then encounter the bank robbers. While all of these humans are essentially baggage to the Vampire Hunter, they end up traveling together anyway. As they make their way to the castle, they try to discover who has brought the enchanted troops back, and for what purpose.

Scenes from an Unholy War

The story begins by describing a pair D has seen several times in his travels: a woman and a man, always together, always on the road. Cut to a village called Genevez on the western edge of the Frontier, where D encounters the pair for a third time. The man, named Rust, is the sheriff there, and the woman, Lira, assists him in his duties. D is among the warriors and mercenaries summoned to defend the village from a notorious bandit gang known as the Black Death. But now it appears the Black Death won't be descending on the village, and the mayor wants to dismiss the hired help at a fraction of their agreed wages. The deputy mayor, Odama, wants to pay them even less, or kill the itinerant warriors so they won't join forces with the Black Death. D rewards Odama for his scathing character assessment by lopping off his nose.

No sooner does D leave the scene than he's struck by "sunlight syndrome"—the periodic ailment unique to dhampirs last seen in Demon Deathchase. Strangely enough, the staff of the local hotel have been taught what to do for a dhampir in these dire straits, so D is in good hands. But while D is recovering, and his left hand is running the show, Rust and Lira ask him to hang around a while longer and help them out. It seems the Black Death is going to pay a call on them after all.

Record of the Blood Battle

D agrees to escort a convoy carrying a Noble to face public trial. A bandit seeks the "Dead Love Flower" that the Noble had successfully cultivated, and the enemies of the Noble's parents target the men and women of the group. Can D bring himself to kill humans in order to protect the Noble!?

White Devil Mountain

D — White Devil Mountain (Part One): A shuttle containing a Noble in a coffin crashes into White Devil Mountain while en route to the Capital. The Noble is none other than Gilzen, who is detested as a demon to the point that even allied Nobles chose to bind his coffin with heavy chains and seal it deep underground. Commissioned by a Noble to recover the coffin, D ventures into the snowstorm which constantly rages around the mountain. In tow are two men, a female doctor, a guard, a boy looking for his father, and a female bounty hunter who opposes D. Gathering together, they begin the dangerous hike up the mountain.

D — White Devil Mountain (Part Two): Within a castle piercing the mountainside, D finds the group of knights who protect the most unlucky Noble, Gilzen, like their king. However, another soldier is waiting for him—an extraterrestrial who crash landed 10,000 years ago and was captured and turned into a vampire by Gilzen. Using the advanced technology that Gilzen stole from the extraterrestrial, he separates the castle and those within from the flow of time. His goal: to oppose the Sacred Ancestor's rise to power.

Iriya the Berserker

An attractive female warrior named Iriya appears before D. Since childhood, her goal has been to slay her parents and siblings who had been transformed into vampires by the Nobility.

Throng of Heretics

A device which has observed ruins in the southern Frontier Sector for 300 years suddenly deactivates. Nobles who were cruelly slaughtered by the hands of men, the survivors of the Zeno family, are revived. Fearing the fangs of vengeance, the mayor of the village where the murderer's descendants reside hires five vampire hunters. As the mayor returns from the Capital, five enemies target his daughter. During a thunderstorm, a noble attacks her on the mountain pass. Amid the flashes of lightning, the master's beautiful visage appears... The blood-sucking Nobles, the hunters, and D—the chaotic journey of three parties begins as the bloody wind blows.

Undead Island

There was once a laboratory of the Nobility on a lone island, from which white mist poured out, and a nearby fishing village whose citizens would vanish, reduced to servants of the Nobility. The village, Meg, was struck by this tragedy countless times. The town's security officer hired bounty hunters to cross to the solitary island, to investigate and return to the village with news, but the mysterious troupe was soon seized. What's more, the beautiful D has been witnessed on the island. Who on Earth could have hired him, and why is he there? D displays his serene swordsmanship on the Nobility's island in this eagerly anticipated publication.

Bedeviled Stagecoach

A female government official is ordered to escort captured servants of the Nobility on a convoy, along with three aides: a hunter, a blacksmith, and a barmaid, to the Capital. However, the highway crosses into the territory of the Noble that is their master. In the wake of monster attacks which increase as they approach the danger zone, D appears.

Nightmare Village

A group of travelers caught in a landslide take refuge in a village, once the testing ground for a nightmarish experiment in which the DNA of outer-space beings, humans, and nobles was used to create a new form of life. When the sleeping village awakens with a thirst for blood and a pair of nobles command a bizarre prototype to attack the travelers, D arrives to put an end to the town's legacy.

The Tiger in Winter

At the request of a beautiful woman on the verge of death, D embarks on a journey to meet Duke Van Doren. Villagers, bandits, and an investigation team from the Capital—all rush out in pursuit of the Duke's mysterious new invention. What is this invention that could change the world? As the setting sun continues its descent and time transitions into an endless winter, a solitary Noble, once renowned as the Royal Tiger for his valor on the battlefield, welcomes D.

Noble Front

Hired to kill a Noble who has been sharing technology with humans in exchange for sacrifices, D travels to the Castle of Bergenzy in the Northern Frontier. However, the fortress was once a testing ground for the Sacred Ancestor's mysterious experiments, and its terrible legacy may just be the most horrific enemy that D has ever faced. Originally announced with the working title .

Gold Fiend

A thousand years ago, the Nobility taught a physician the key to creating a new breed of human beings, and he kidnapped and killed over a thousand men and women in order to produce such a neo-human. However, after that, local villagers attacked his home and set it ablaze, killing his successful samples... or so it seemed. Now the village is being visited by mysterious men and women and, one by one, the villagers are falling victim to fatal vampiric attacks. Just then, who should appear but D...!? Originally announced with the working title .

Sylvia's Road Home

Festival of the Nobility

Banquet in Purgatory

The Twisted Nobleman

The Wicked Beauty

Originally announced with the working title .

Lost Legion of the Nobility

The Five Assassins

Cursed Demon Flight

Deadened City

Originally serialized monthly in Issatsu no Hon magazine from November 2017 through August 2018.

The Visitor in Black

Originally announced with the working title .

Mountain Demon

Originally serialized monthly in Issatsu no Hon magazine from September 2018 through June 2019.

Dark Witchsong

Originally serialized monthly in Issatsu no Hon magazine under the title  from July 2019 through May 2020.

The Assassins' Stronghold

Demon Howl Expedition

Originally serialized monthly in Issatsu no Hon magazine from June 2020 through March 2021.

Bloodwind Trail

Originally serialized monthly in Issatsu no Hon magazine from April 2021 through January 2022.

Omnibus editions

Book One

Collects the first three volumes of the series: Vampire Hunter D, Raiser of Gales, and Demon Deathchase.

Book Two

Collects volumes four through six of the series: Tale of the Dead Town, The Stuff of Dreams, and Pilgrimage of the Sacred and the Profane.

Book Three

Collects volumes seven through nine of the series: Mysterious Journey to the North Sea Parts One and Two and The Rose Princess.

Another Vampire Hunter series

The Noble Greylancer

Set in the year 7001 of the Noble Calendar, during the early stages of the conflict between the Nobility and the Outer Space Beings, which would come to be known as the Three Thousand Years' War. It follows the exploits of Greylancer, a powerful warrior of the Nobility and Lord of the Northern Frontier Sector, as he battles the invading OSB and an anti-Noble faction, and gets caught up in a conspiracy involving the ruling Council and the rebel Mayerling.

Blood of a Hero

Five years after the previous volume, a new enemy of the Nobility has arisen. The hero Sunhawk, after rampaging across the Frontier, has finally invaded Greylancer's Northern Frontier Sector. However a mysterious disease has claimed the lives of several Nobles who have fed on human blood, and the fearful Nobility has ordered Greylancer to infiltrate a free land known as the Twilight Zone in order to discover its source. Awaiting him are the malevolent OSB and a rebel Noble, along with the assassins who have joined him. Meanwhile, a conspiracy to place the entire Frontier under the sole rule of the Capital is revealed, and a noble begins to slaughter humans with toxic blood. The chaos leads Greylancer to the Nobility's Grand Ball, lance in hand. What will become of Sunhawk, and what will come of the incident?

Novellas

Dark Nocturne

Vampire Hunter Anthology: D — Dark Nocturne, published between Vampire Hunter 7: D — Mysterious Journey to the North Sea and Vampire Hunter 8: D — The Rose Princess, is a supplemental volume that exists outside of the main numbering scheme and collects the following novellas, which were originally serialized in Asahi Sonorama's sci-fi magazine Shishi-oh from October 1991 through February 1992:

Dark Nocturne
: The first tale concerns Ry, a young man who goes to Anise village seeking the haunting song he'd heard from his father on his deathbed. Many vampires had been entertained at a chateau there until about 200 years earlier, and they lured young men and women in their twenties there with a song no one else could duplicate. That same song had been heard again 20 years before our story begins. On his way to Anise, Ry encounters Price and his cohorts Bijima and Kurt. Price heard the ghostly tune while in his mother's womb, and can imitate it. But he and his lackeys seem to be up to no good. D appears in time to save the boy. The female mayor of the village has hired the Vampire Hunter, among others, to find out what's going on at the chateau, and to see if the vampires have returned. D sees his life complicated by Amne, the headstrong daughter of the innkeeper where D is lodging and just the sort of cat curiosity so often kills. Originally published in the October and November 1991 issues of Shishi-oh.

An Ode to Imagined Fall
: The second story takes place in a village called "Shirley's Door," which is famous for its beauty in fall. A centenarian known as "Helga of the Red Basket" hires D when she foresees trouble in the swamp near her home—a place where the vampiric Nobility once dwelled. This particular village long made it a practice to offer up one of extraordinary beauty so that everyone else might be spared, and Mayor Murtock is willing to continue the tradition to preserve the peace. The real problem there is that his son, Lyle, happens to be in love with the intended sacrifice—a girl named Cecile. D has met the pair on his way into town, so you can imagine he's not about to sit back and do nothing while humans turn on humans. Originally published in the December 1991 and January 1992 issues of Shishi-oh.

Legend of the War Fiends
: The final section begins in a massive castle carved from a mountain in the center of an "Armageddon Zone"—an area with a radius of 2000 km left barren by a battle between two vampire clans that lasted 5000 years. The castle has a nuclear generator that produces 50 million megawatts of power per hour, which for the last 2000 years has gone into creating Dynus, a  man with a somewhat childish demeanor. He is one clan's "last strike," and apparently they weren't the only ones with that foresight. A girl named Raya who has been sold into the entertainment business in the Capital is the other side's sleeper agent. Her witch-like powers come from genetic encoding done centuries earlier by other vampires to stage this one last battle. D is on the scene to protect Raya until she leaves for her new job, but the strange visitors to the area are apparently there to watch the fireworks and see which of the extinct clans triumphs in the end. The two ill-fated individuals not only befriend D, but they also grow quite fond of each other, but their fate was decided millennia earlier. Originally published in the February 1992 issue of Shishi-oh.

Short stories

Armageddon
: Originally published in Yoshitaka Amano's 1984 artbook Maten, and later collected in Kikuchi's short story collection The Chaser and in Vampire Hunter "D" Reader's Guide. The short story offers a brief glimpse into the final showdown between D and his father, the Sacred Ancestor.

Portrait of Yzobel
: Originally published in 1997 in the artbook Coffin - Vampire Hunter D as Portrait of Ixobel. An English translation by Kevin Leahy was included in the original Japanese edition of the artbook, making it the first piece of Vampire Hunter D literature to be published English. It was later collected in Vampire Hunter "D" Reader's Guide, and retranslated by Kevin Leahy as Portrait of Yzobel for the English edition of the guidebook.

Village in Fog
: Originally published in 2000 in the artbook Yoshitaka Amano Picture Collection - Vampire Hunter "D", and collected in Vampire Hunter "D" Reader's Guide.

The Castle's Resident
: Originally given as a prize to a fan as a handwritten manuscript at Kikuchi's second annual "Bonenkai" year-end party in Shinjuku, it was later published in 2001 in Vampire Hunter "D" Reader's Guide.

On the Night Road
: A short story written exclusively to be published in 2001 in Vampire Hunter "D" Reader's Guide.

Message from Cecile
: Published in 2005 in Vampire Hunter D - Audio Drama CD Box. At the time the only Vampire Hunter D short story that had yet to be published in English. Adapted into a multi-issue comic book series Vampire Hunter D: Message from Mars.

BB Project
: Published in 2006 in Dream World Temptation: Hideyuki Kikuchi's Complete Works. Takes place a thousand years after the events depicted in Armageddon.

The Wanderer's Ship
: Published in the New York Anime Festival 2008 Official Guide Book. One of three original manuscripts written by Hideyuki Kikuchi which have been raffled off to fans, along with publication rights, at his semi-annual fan gatherings in Japan. The recipient of this particular manuscript, Hitomi Yasue, decided to share the story with an English audience, hoping to expose more English readers to the novel series. It was subsequently translated by Kevin Leahy and published in the New York Anime Festival 2008 Official Guide Book, and a live reading by professional voice actors was also performed at the convention. To date, it has only been released in English.

Voyage Through Strange Waters
: A short story manuscript distributed exclusively to attendees of Kikuchi's houseboat tour in November 2011.

Siren of the Cape
: Published on February 12, 2021 in Masaya Yamaguchi's A Sweet and Painful Kiss: Vampire Compilation, an anthology celebrating the 99th birthday of the late Christopher Lee, along with an essay written by Kikuchi titled Vampire Hunter K's Vampire Movie Recommendations.

Other works

Coffin — Vampire Hunter D

Coffin is a retrospective of Yoshitaka Amano's work on the Vampire Hunter D series up to the release of D - Pale Fallen Angel 4, and includes nearly all of the Vampire Hunter illustrations, prints, and sketches produced in that 14-year period by Amano, as well as an original short story, Portrait of Yzobel, by Kikuchi.

Yoshitaka Amano Art Collection: Vampire Hunter "D"

Vampire Hunter "D" Reader's Guide

Billed as "the essential companion to the world of Vampire Hunter D", this guidebook includes rare artwork and sketches, a behind-the-scenes look at Kikuchi's writing process, a collection of short stories, and an extensive glossary of characters and terminology appearing in the series up to and including D - Dark Road. Omitted from the English release, the original Japanese edition also includes commentaries and essays, a look at Vampire Hunter D: Bloodlust and other contemporary vampire media, and a discussion between Kikuchi and Yoshiaki Kawajiri. The English edition's glossary is expanded to nearly 200 pages, however, and more closely resembles an encyclopedia.

Yoshiaki Kawajiri's "Vampire Hunter D" Storyboard Collection

This 647 page art book contains Kawajiri's storyboards created for Vampire Hunter D: Bloodlust.

Vampire Hunter Tale: The Hunter in White
 is a short manga written by Hideyuki Kikuchi and illustrated by Ai Kozaki that was published in 2004 by Kawade Shobō Shinsha in Kawade Dream Mook: Hideyuki Kikuchi Special Edition. It depicts a handsome vampire hunter saving a pair of sisters fleeing from a Noble and his hunting hounds. The unnamed hunter has dark skin and dreadlocks, is clad in elegant white attire including a cloak and cavalier hat, and wields a shashka — an inversion of D's general appearance.

Vampire Hunter Aside: Dhampir Hunting

A spinoff light novel written by Yūki Asakawa with story supervision from Hideyuki Kikuchi, illustrated by Yukito, and published by Asahi under the Asahi Aero Paperback imprint. The story deviates from the established lore of the main series and depicts a beautiful female Dhampir Hunter named Olivia Cross, who is hired by a Noble to eliminate a group of vampiric half breeds who have been kidnapping and murdering young women in his territory. Though the novel sets up a potential ongoing series, it was not continued.

References

External links
DHpress Books
Digital Manga Publishing
Asahi Shinbun Publishing - The current Japanese publisher of the Vampire Hunter series.
Hideyuki Kikuichi Official Fan Club (Japanese)

Vampire Hunter D
DH Press
Vampire Hunter D